Jovan Marinović (1821 – August 30, 1893) was a Serbian politician and diplomat. He introduced several enlightened reforms in Serbian political system. As a close collaborator of powerful Minister Ilija Garašanin, young Jovan Marinović climbed rapidly and became the leader of the Serbian Conservatives, eventually becoming Prime Minister of the Principality of Serbia. Educated in Paris, Marinović was a sophisticated gentleman, who believed in European culture and reforms as a way of enlightening the Serbian peasant society.

Being a member of the first generation of Serbian Western-educated intellectuals, Jovan Marinović occupied several high-ranking posts in the state administration throughout his career. He was highly regarded as a diplomat.

Early life
Born to a Serbian family in Sarajevo, at the time part of the Bosnia Eyalet in the Ottoman Empire, Marinović moved to neighboring Principality of Serbia as a child. Being a semi-independent state entity, the Serbian principality was in the process of ridding itself of the Ottoman influence.

He finished secondary school in Kragujevac in 1837 and got employed in Chancery of the Prince (Knjaževa kancelarija) under Prince Miloš Obrenović I. Marinović studied in Paris from 1841 until 1842, returning to Serbia to work as a secretary in the State Council. In 1843, he returned to the Prince's chancery in the head capacity, this time under Prince Aleksandar Karađorđević as Karađorđevićs in the meantime retook the power in Serbia from Obrenovićs.

Marinović went back to Paris in 1847, formally in order to finish his studies. However, in practice, he became the unofficial Serbian representative in the Kingdom of France, commonly known as the July Monarchy, a state ruled by King Louis Philippe I.

Political career
During the French Revolution of 1848, part of the 1848-1849 revolutionary wave throughout central and western Europe, Marinović stayed in France, as the country transformed into the French Second Republic.

In the following years, Marinović de facto became a person in charge of the Serbian foreign policy. Although formally performing other posts (Secretary of the State Council until 1850), Marinović was, as a special assistant to Ilija Garašanin, in control of the whole network of Serbian political propaganda in the Ottoman Empire. In 1853, Imperial Russia asked for the dismissal of both Garašanin and his first assistant Marinović for being too close to the Second French Empire and the Paris-based Polish agents of Adam Czartoryski and their representative in Belgrade.

Marinović later became Minister of Finance (1856–1858) and the President of the State Council (1861–1873). Between 1861 and 1867 Marinović was anew the first aide of Prime Minister Ilija Garašanin and Prince Mihailo Obrenović, during their ambitious policy of forming a wider Balkan alliance and fomenting a general Christian uprising against the Ottomans. Marinović was sent to confidential missions to St. Petersburg, Paris, London and Constantinople.

Marinović belonged to the political grouping of Serbian Conservatives (Ilija Garašanin, Danilo Stefanović, Nikola Hristić and Filip Hristić). As the highest-ranking conservative after Ilija Garašanin, Marinović became Prime Minister on November 3, 1873, under a Liberal-Conservative coalition and kept the portfolio of Foreign Minister (November 3, 1873, to December 7, 1874) as well. By administrative fiat, the Marinović cabinet established freedom of speech and the press, which was an important step in establishing parliamentary democracy. Nikola Krstić was working on changes in the press law for the Marinović Administration. At the session of the Serbian Parliament held on November 27, 1873, the Marinović government presented a set of far-reaching reform laws, including the law on the subsidization of industrial enterprises and the law of six days of land ploughing ("day" meaning a Serbian land measurement equivalent to 5,760 m2), as a minimal privately owned landed property protected from being sold or repossessed due to debts. This allowed Serbian peasants who were small landowners, at the time often victims of property loss due to predatory lending, to have at least  of land (out of the total land which they owned) they could always count on as remaining in their possession. On December 23, 1873, his government instituted the law by which corporal punishment was abolished and the prison system reformed. Other reforms regarding secondary school and the Belgrade's Grandes écoles were passed as well.

The Marinović government introduced the metric system into Serbia as well as a native silver currency. After losing the majority among Liberal deputies in Parliament in 1874, the Marinović cabinet became the first Serbian government to be toppled in the National Assembly and called for new elections. After being defeated at the parliamentary elections in October 1874, Marinović resigned. He was appointed Serbian Envoy to Paris from 1879 to 1889.

Personal
Marinović married Persida Anastasijević, one of the wealthy merchant Miša Anastasijević's five daughters. Their marriage was seen as the continuation of Miša Anastasijević's practice of marrying his daughters off to important decision-makers in the Principality of Serbia thereby securing personal wealth and expanding political influence.

Jovan Marinović and Persida had three children — two sons and a daughter.

One of their sons, Velizar, later married Agripina Bronkov, a Russian woman of Polish ancestry, moving with her to France where their son Petar Marinović was born in 1898. Known in France as Pierre Marinovitch, young Petar became an aviator with French Air Force in World War I, distinguishing himself as a flying ace.

References and further reading

Pisma Ilije Garašanina Jovanu Marinoviću, vol. I (1848–1858)-II (1859–1874), Srpska kraljevska akademija 1931.414+381.
Alex Dragnich, The Development of Parliamentary Government in Serbia, Boulder & New York, East European Monograph & Columbia University Press 1978.
Michael Boro Petrovich, The History of Modern Serbia, vol. I-II, Harcourt Brace Jovanovich, New York 1976.
Željan E. Šuster, Historical Dictionary of the Federal Republic of Yugoslavia, Scarecrow Press, Langham Md. & London 1999.
David MacKenzie, Jovan Marinović: Evropski gospodin i srpski diplomata (1821–1893), Centar za unapredjivanje pavih studija, Beograd 2006.

1821 births
1893 deaths
Politicians from Kragujevac
Serbs of Bosnia and Herzegovina
Prime Ministers of Serbia
Finance ministers of Serbia
19th-century Serbian people
People from the Principality of Serbia
Foreign ministers of Serbia